Sullen may refer to:

 Sullen (band), an American punk rock band
 Edward Sullen, a fictional character in the 2010 film Vampires Suck
 Squire Sullen and Kate Sullen, fictional characters in the 1707 play The Beaux' Stratagem

See also
 Depression (mood)
 Sullens, a municipality of Vaud, Switzerland

Sullen also means: sad, gloomy, depressed.